Alfred Guillaume Gabriel Grimod d'Orsay, comte d'Orsay (4 September 18014 August 1852) was a French amateur artist, dandy, and man of fashion in the early- to mid-19th century.

Biography
He was born in Paris, the second son of Albert Gaspard Grimaud, Comte d'Orsay, a Bonapartist general.  His mother was Baroness Eleonore von Franquemont, an illegitimate daughter of the Duke of Württemberg and the Italian adventuress Anne Franchi.  His elder brother died in infancy.

In 1821, he entered the French army of the restored Bourbon monarchy (against his own Bonapartist tendencies), attending the lavish coronation of George IV of the United Kingdom in London that year (staying until 1822) and serving as a Garde du Corps of Louis XVIII. While in London he formed an acquaintance with Charles Gardiner, 1st Earl of Blessington and Marguerite, Countess of Blessington, which quickly ripened into intimacy. Scholars have speculated both that the Countess and d'Orsay had an affair, and that the infatuation was purely between the Earl and d'Orsay. While contemporaries remarked on the young man's effeminacy, the evidence for either relationship is inconclusive.<ref>Reiman, Donald H Shelley and His Circle, 1773–1822 Vols 7–8, Harvard University Press, 1986, p442 Note 200.</ref>

The following year the couple visited d'Orsay at Valence on the Rhone, and at the invitation of the earl he accompanied the party on their tour through Italy.

In the spring of 1823, he met Lord Byron at Genoa, and the published correspondence of the poet at this period contains numerous references to d'Orsay's gifts and accomplishments, and to his peculiar relationship to the Blessington family. A diary which d'Orsay had kept during his visit to London in 1821–1822 was submitted to Byron's inspection, and was much praised by him for the knowledge of men and manners and the keen faculty of observation it displayed.

On 1 December 1827, Count d'Orsay married Lady Harriet Gardiner, a girl of fifteen, the daughter of Lord Blessington by his previous wife. The union, if it rendered his connection with the Blessington family less ostensibly equivocal than before, was in other respects an unhappy one, and a legal separation took place in 1838, at which Lady Harriet paid over £100,000 to his creditors (though even this did not cover all his debts) in exchange for d'Orsay giving up all claims to the Blessington estate.

After the death of Lord Blessington, which occurred in 1829, the widowed countess returned to England, accompanied by d'Orsay, and her home, first at Seamore Place, then at Gore House, soon became a resort of the fashionable literary and artistic society of London, which found an equal attraction in host and in hostess. The count's charming manner, brilliant wit, and artistic faculty were accompanied by benevolent moral qualities, which endeared him to all his associates. His skill as a painter and sculptor was shown in numerous portraits and statuettes representing his friends, which were marked by great vigour and truthfulness, if wanting in the finish that can only be reached by persistent discipline.

It was at Gore House that d'Orsay met Benjamin Disraeli and Edward Bulwer-Lytton, themselves young men of fashion who dabbled in the arts. D'Orsay and Disraeli were good friends in the 1830s–to the point that Disraeli asked d'Orsay to be his second, when it appeared that Disraeli would fight a duel with Morgan O'Connell, the son of Irish agitator Daniel O'Connell. D'Orsay declined, on the grounds of being a foreigner, and Disraeli went with Henry Baillie, a mutual friend. The character of Count Alcibiades de Mirabel in Disraeli's novel Henrietta Temple was modeled on d'Orsay, to whom the book was dedicated.

Count d'Orsay had been from his youth a zealous Bonapartist, and one of the most frequent guests at Gore House was Prince Louis-Napoleon Bonaparte. In 1849 the count went bankrupt, and the establishment at Gore House being broken up, he went to Paris. Lady Blessington sold almost all her possessions and followed him there, but died a few weeks after her arrival, leaving him heartbroken. He endeavoured to provide for himself by painting portraits. He was deep in the counsels of the prince-president (who had also returned to Paris from exile, and been elected president the year before d'Orsay arrived), but relations between them were less cordial after Louis-Napoléon's 1851 coup d'état (the French Parliament is dissolved), of which the count had expressed his strong disapproval.

Reluctant to entrust d'Orsay with any affairs of state, prince-president Louis-Napoleon finally offered him the position of surintendant of the Beaux-Arts School. Within a few months of the appointment, however, D'Orsay contracted a spinal infection, of which he died on 4 August 1852 in the house of his sister Ida, duchesse de Gramont, at Chambourcy, just a few days after his appointment had been officially announced. He had designed a pyramidal grey stone tomb for Lady Blessington at Chambourcy, and he too was buried in it, with the not yet Emperor Napoleon III among the mourners at the funeral.

Cultural references
Eustace Tilley, the mascot of The New Yorker'' magazine, was based on an engraving of D'Orsay, interpreted by house cartoonist and art director Rea Irvin.

Archives
His correspondence with Disraeli and his wife, and his letters to Lord Lichfield, are held in the Bodleian Library, Oxford.
His letters 25 letters from d'Orsay to Charles Stewart, 3rd Marquess of Londonderry (dated 1851), concerning the publication of newspaper articles in France relating to Abd-el-Kadir and to French politics and literary life in general, are held in the County Durham record office at Ref No. D/Lo/C 74.
His letters to Bulwer-Lytton are held in the Hertfordshire Archives and Local Studies centre, Hertford.

References

W. Teignmouth Shore, D'Orsay, or, The complete dandy (1911)
M. Sadleir, Blessington–D'Orsay: a masquerade (1933)
R. R. Madden, The literary life and correspondence of the countess of Blessington, 3 vols. (1855)
The Times (6, 7, 10 August 1852)
Annual Register (1852)

External links

 
 
 
 

1801 births
1852 deaths
Alfred
Artists from Paris
19th-century French military personnel